The Optimist is a small, single-handed sailing dinghy intended for use by young people up to the age of 15.

The Optimist is one of the two most popular sailing dinghies in the world, with over 150,000 boats officially registered with the class and many more built but never registered. It is sailed in over 120 countries and it is one of only two sailboats as an International Class by World Sailing exclusively for sailors under 16.

Origin
The Optimist was designed in 1947 by American Clark Mills at the request of the Clearwater Florida Optimist service club following a proposal by Major Clifford McKay to offer low-cost sailing for young people. The Optimist Club ran a soap box derby, but wanted more than a single-day event. Thus they were looking for a low-cost equivalent for sailing. He designed a simple pram that could be built from two 4' x 8' sheets of plywood, and donated the plan to the Optimists.

The design was slightly modified and introduced to Europe by Axel Damgaard, and spread outwards across Europe from Scandinavia. The design was standardized in 1960 and became a strict One-Design in 1995.

Description

Rig

The single sail of the Optimist is sprit-rigged. Two battens stiffen the leech. It is secured evenly with ties along the luff to the mast and along the foot to the boom, pulled down tightly by a vang/kicker. The light, slim third spar, the sprit, extends through a loop at the peak of the sail; the bottom rests in the eye of a short cable or string which hangs along the front edge of the mast. Raising and lowering the sprit and adjusting the boom vang and outhaul allow for adaptation of sail trim to a range of wind conditions.

The spars may be made from aluminium or wood, but are invariably aluminium in modern boats.

A monograph-style "IO" insignia (after IODA - the International Optimist Dinghy Association) on the sail is a registered trade-mark and may only be used under licence from the International Optimist Association. Optimists also have a national sail number using the Olympic abbreviation of their country and a sequential numbers. e.g. RSA for South Africa.

Hull
The Optimist has a pram hull, originally formed primarily from five pieces of plywood. It was the biggest hull Clark Mills could make from two 4 ft by 8 ft sheets. Just in front of a bulkhead, which partitions the boat nearly in half, is the daggerboard case. Right behind it on the centerline of the hull floor are attached a block and a ratchet block. These anchor the sheet and a block on the boom directly above. At the bow resides a thwart to support the mast which passes through a hole in its centre to the mast step mounted on the centre line of the boat. The painter, a rope used for securing a boat like a mooring line, is usually tied around the mast step.

Buoyancy bags are installed inboard along each side in the front half of the boat and at the stern to provide buoyancy in the event of capsizing. Two straps, known as "hiking straps", run lengthwise along the floor from the bulkhead to the stern. These and a tiller extension allow a sailor to hang off the side for weight distribution—commonly called "hiking out". This can be crucial to keeping the boat more upright during heavy air, allowing greater speed through the water.

The vast majority of hulls today are made of fiberglass, although a few wooden hulls are still made.

Daggerboard and Rudder
The rudder and daggerboard are made from fibreglass though plywood may be used for training and with wooden hulls.

Performance
While younger lighter sailors begin in Optimists, competitive sailors usually weigh between 35 and 55 kg (or between 80 lbs. and 125 lbs.). Optimists can be sailed by children from age 8 to 15. This wide range of weights which is not typical of most dinghies is made possible by different cuts of sail. Due to its inherent stability, unstayed rig, robust construction and relatively small sail, the Optimist can be sailed in winds of up to 30 knots.

Optimists are manufactured to the same specification by over 20 builders on four continents. There is strong evidence that hulls from different builders are the same speed. Sails and spars of differing qualities enable sailors to upgrade their equipment as they progress.

The Optimist is the slowest dinghy in the world according to the RYA Portsmouth Yardstick scheme, with a Portsmouth number of 1646. Its equivalent rating in the US scheme is a D-PN of 123.6.

Competition

The Optimist is the biggest youth racing class in the world. As well as the annual world championship the class also has six continental championships, attended by a total of over 850 sailors a year. Many of the top world Optimist sailors have become world-class Laser Radial or 4.7 sailors after they "age-out" but many also excel in double-handers such as the 420 and 29er.
At the 2020 Olympics at least 75% of the boat skipper medalists were former Optimist world or continental championship sailors.

The first World Championship was held in Great Britain in 1962 and it has grown to over 60 countries participating. The changing pattern of the strongest countries can be seen from the results of the Nations Cup. For the first 20 years, the class was dominated by sailors from the Scandinavian countries, with 13 world champions. In the 1990s Argentina was by far the dominant country but, following standardisation of the boat and improved coaching standards internationally, many countries have excelled as shown in the results below. Recently S.E. Asian countries and the United States have produced strong teams. The Optimist World Championships include Team Racing which is increasingly popular.

Continental Championships are held on each continent (the Oceanian held jointly with the Asian). Results can be found at.

Open Events: With competitive charter boats easily available and low-cost airfares, there are scores of open international regattas. The largest is the Lake Garda Easter Meeting with over 1,000 Optimists participating.

Manufacture
In recent years, over 2,200 boats a year have been produced by around 30 builders worldwide.

Events

World Championship

See also
IceOptimist—iceboat with the Optimist rig

Related development
El Toro (dinghy)
Holdfast Trainer
Naples Sabot
Sabot (dinghy)
US Sabot

References

External links

 International Optimist Dinghy Association
 IODA Results Archive
 World Sailing
 List of National Class Associations

 
Vehicles introduced in 1947
1940s sailboat type designs